Night nurse may refer to:

A nurse who works an overnight shift

Film
Night Nurse (1931 film), starring Barbara Stanwyck
The Night Nurse, a 1977 Australian television film
Night Nurse (1979 film), starring Gloria Guida

Music
Nightnurse, a 1990s English rock band
Night Nurse (album), by Gregory Isaacs (1982)
"Night Nurse" (Gregory Isaacs song), the title track, later a hit in 1997 for Sly & Robbie featuring Simply Red
"Night Nurse" (Cascada song) (2011)
"Night Nurse", a song by Dean & Britta from L'Avventura (2003)

Other uses
Night Nurse (comics), a 1972–73 Marvel Comics title and character
Night Nurse (horse) (1971–1999), a National Hunt racehorse
Night Nurse, an over the counter cold and flu remedy by GlaxoSmithKline